Out of Nowhere is the debut album by jazz guitarist Harold Fethe, who performs on this outing in the style of Django Reinhardt. Accompanying him is the legendary Johnny Frigo on violin, who like Fethe got a late start with his own career.

Track listing 
"Out of Nowhere" (6:23)
"Cuenca Mercado" (4:02)
"Take the "A" Train" (6:27)
"There Is No Greater Love" (4:12)
"Detour Ahead" (5:24)
"It Might as Well Be Spring" (3:48)
"You and the Night and the Music" (5:00)
"Softly, as in a Morning Sunrise" (5:24)
"You Are My Sunshine" (4:14)
"September in the Rain" (5:28)
"This Masquerade" (5:21)       
"Alexander's Ragtime Band" (4:56)

Personnel
Harold Fethe – guitar
Johnny Frigo – violin
Jim Cox – double-bass
Joe Vito – piano, accordion
Joanie Pallatto – vocals

2006 debut albums
Harold Fethe albums